Sutton Hall, originally called The Education Building, is a building on the University of Texas at Austin campus, serving as one of the four buildings supporting the School of Architecture, the others being Battle Hall, West Mall Building, and Goldsmith Hall.  It was designed by Cass Gilbert, who also designed Battle Hall, the architecture library on the same campus.  Originally, Sutton Hall housed the College of Education.

In 1927, the University separated the Department of Psychology out of the Department of Philosophy, and moved Psychology out of Garrison Hall and onto the 3rd floor of Sutton Hall, where it would share space with the Department of Educational Psychology for the next 25 years.

Today, Sutton Hall houses architecture studios, labs, and offices, including graduate admissions for the school. It is also home to the Architectural Robotics Lab.

See also
 History of The University of Texas at Austin
 List of University of Texas at Austin buildings

References

Works cited
 

Cass Gilbert buildings
University of Texas at Austin campus
School buildings completed in 1918
University and college buildings completed in 1918
1918 establishments in Texas